The Bayard class was a pair of two ironclad warships built for the French Navy in the late 1870s and early 1880s. The class is sometimes referred to as the Turenne class. They were based on the ironclad , adopting the same general arrangement, but were scaled down in size. They were intended for use overseas in the French colonial empire, and as such, they retained a sailing rig for long-range cruising and copper sheathing for their hulls to protect them when they would be unable to be dry-docked regularly. They carried a main battery of four  guns that were mounted in individual barbettes; two were in sponsons forward, abreast of the conning tower, and the other two were on the centerline aft.

Turenne was laid up upon completion in 1882, while Bayard was sent to East Asian waters, where she served much of her career as a flagship. She saw action during the Tonkin campaign that established France's colonial empire in what became French Indochina, as well as the Sino-French War that immediately followed. After Vice Admiral Amédée Courbet died in 1885, Bayard carried his remains back to France. Turenne replaced her as the flagship in East Asia, but she had a much less eventful stint in the region, remaining there until 1889, when she returned to France to be placed in reserve once more in 1890. Bayard returned to Indochina in 1893, and she remained there until being decommissioned in 1899 and reduced to a storage hulk, a role she filled until 1904. By that time, Turenne had been sold for scrapping in 1901, and Bayard followed her to the breakers' yard in 1904.

Design
The Bayard class, also referred to as the Turenne class, of barbette ships was designed in the late 1870s as part of a naval construction program that began under the post-Franco-Prussian War fleet plan of 1872. At the time, the French Navy categorized its capital ships as high-seas ships for the main fleet, station ironclads for use in the French colonial empire, and smaller coastal defense ships. The Bayard class was intended to serve in the second role. The naval architect Victorin Sabattier submitted a proposal to build a scaled-down version of his high-seas ironclad  to meet requirements issued by the French Naval Minister Charles de Dompierre d'Hornoy, who wanted new designs for station ironclads. Sabattier's initial design included four main battery guns arranged as in Amiral Duperré: all in open barbettes, two side-by-side forward and the other two on the centerline aft. These were supplemented with a single heavy bow chaser, but during construction, a stern chaser was added, since the aft main battery guns were masked by the ships' rigging.

Characteristics and machinery

They displaced . The ships had a sharply raked forecastle and relatively minimal superstructure, consisting of a small bridge directly astern of the forward main battery barbettes. Unlike several of their French predecessors, the Bayard-class ships disposed with iron hulls and reverted to wooden hulls, which were sheathed in copper to reduce fouling on extended voyages overseas, where shipyard facilities were less available. This may have been the result of British reports of hull corrosion with their iron-hulled vessels. Their crews numbered 24 officers and 425 enlisted men.

Their propulsion machinery consisted of two compound steam engines, each driving a single screw propeller, with steam provided by eight coal-burning fire-tube boilers. The boilers were vented through a pair of uptakes that passed through a single funnel casing; Turennes casing covered the uptakes entirely, while Bayards terminated well below the top, giving her the appearance of having a pair of small funnels placed closely together.

To supplement the steam engines on long voyages overseas, they were fitted with a full-ship rig.

Armament and armor

Their main battery consisted of four , 19-caliber M1870M guns mounted in individual barbette mounts, two forward placed abreast and two aft, both on the centerline. They carried a pair of  19.8-cal. M1870 guns, one in the bow and one in the stern as chase guns. These guns were supported by a secondary battery of six  21.3-cal. M1870 guns carried in a central battery located amidships in the hull, three guns per broadside. They also carried a single  17-cal. 12-pounder bronze rifled gun. Their armament was rounded out with two  torpedo tubes in above-water launchers. 

Between 1883 and 1885, both ships had a light battery for defense against torpedo boats installed. This consisted of twelve  1-pounder Hotchkiss revolvers, all in individual mounts. At that time, the bronze gun was removed, and a pair of  field guns that could be taken ashore by landing parties were added. By 1890, four  3-pounder Hotchkiss revolver cannon were added to supplement the 37 mm guns.

Ships

Service history

There, she saw extensive service during the Tonkin campaign, which established the French protectorate over northern Vietnam and led to the creation of French Indochina. During the war, she took part in the Battle of Thuận An in August 1883. The French intervention in Tonkin resulted in the Sino-French War between France and Qing China, which had previously maintained Tonkin in its sphere of influence. Bayard supported operations during the Keelung campaign, took part in the Battle of Shipu against the Nanyang Fleet in February 1885, and then the Pescadores campaign in March. Courbet died of cholera aboard Bayard in June.

Turenne was recommissioned in 1884 to relieve Bayard as the flagship of the division, remaining there through 1889. During this period, she cruised extensively through East Asia, visiting numerous foreign ports to show the flag. Bayard, for her part, returned home with Courbet's remains in 1885. Turenne returned to France in 1889 and was placed in reserve in April 1890. Bayard returned to the Far East in 1893, resuming her role as the divisional flagship there. She remained in East Asia through 1899. Bayard was struck from the naval register in April 1899 and was thereafter used as a storage hulk in Hạ Long Bay in northern French Indochina from 1899 to 1904, when she was sold to ship breakers. In the meantime, Turenne was struck in September 1900, placed for sale in 1901 and subsequently discarded.

Notes

References
 
 
 
 
 
 
 

Bayard-class ironclads
Ship classes of the French Navy